Tarpak is a village in the İnhisar District, Bilecik Province, Turkey. Its population is 271 (2021). Before the 2013 reorganisation, it was a town (belde).

References

Villages in İnhisar District